Vietnamese Cambodians refer to ethnic group of Vietnamese living in Cambodia or Vietnamese who are of full or partial Khmer  descent. According to Cambodian sources, in 2013 there are about 15,000 Vietnamese people living in Cambodia. Vietnamese source said there are 156,000 people living in Cambodia, while the actual number could be somewhere between 400,000 and one million people, according to independent scholars. They mostly reside in southeastern parts of Cambodia bordering Vietnam or on boathouses in the Tonlé Sap lake and Mekong rivers. The first Vietnamese came to settle modern-day Cambodia from the early 19th century during the era of the Nguyễn lords and most of the Vietnamese came to Cambodia during the periods of French colonial administration and the People's Republic of Kampuchea administration. During the Khmer Republic and Khmer Rouge governments in the 1970s, the Vietnamese were targets of mass genocides; thousands of Vietnamese were killed and many more sought refuge in Vietnam. Ethnic relations between the Cambodians and Vietnamese are poor and the Vietnamese have been the main target of xenophobic attacks by political parties since the 1990s. Most of the Vietnamese are stateless residents of Cambodia and as a result they face difficulties in getting access to education, employment, and housing.

History
Vietnamese settlers first entered the lower reaches of the Mekong and the Prey Nokor area (later Saigon) from the 1620s onwards. The region then as now is known to the Cambodians as Kampuchea Krom but but by cession and conquest, the area came under Vietnamese control. Under the reign of Chey Chettha II, Cambodia  formally ceded the eastern portion to the Nguyễn lords. 

With the unification Vietnam under Emperor Gia Long, the Court of Hue asserted its hegemony in 1813 and sent 10,000 troops to Phnom Penh. The Cambodian court was split into rival factions vying for power and some members of the Cambodian royal sought the support of the Vietnamese, thus implanting Vietnamese power within the kingdom. Favors were granted to allow more Vietnamese settlers and by the reign of Emperor Minh Mang, Vietnam chose to impose its rule directly, relegating the Cambodian court to a minor role. Administrative renaming of town and provinces was carried out while Vietnamese customs were forced upon the Cambodian populace. The heavy-handed policies stirred resentment among the Cambodian populace, provoking protracted insurgency and unrest. Vietnam was forced to withdraw, accepting the restoration of the royal candidate Ang Duong as the Cambodian king. Vietnam nonetheless joined Siam to hold Cambodia in joint vassalage. 

In 1880 with the establishment of the French colonial administration, Cambodia joined Vietnam as part of French Indochina, the status to Vietnamese residents in Cambodia was formally legalized. Over the next fifty years, large numbers of Vietnamese migrated to Cambodia. Population censuses conducted by the French recorded an increase in the Vietnamese population from about 4,500 in the 1860s to almost 200,000 at the end of the 1930s. When the Japanese invaded Indochina in 1940, Vietnamese nationalists in Cambodia launched a brief but unsuccessful attempt to attack the French colonial administrators. 

With independence in 1954, Cambodia legislated a citizenship law based on knowledge in the Khmer language and national origin; this effectively excluded most Vietnamese and Chinese Cambodians. At the grassroot level, Vietnamese also faced occasional cases of violent intimidation from the Cambodians. During a Sangkum congress in 1962, politicians debated on the issue of citizenship on Cambodia's ethnic minorities and a resolution was passed not to grant naturalization of Vietnamese residents.

When Lon Nol assumed power in 1970, the Khmer Republic government launched a propaganda campaign to portray the ethnic Vietnamese as agents of the Vietcong. About 30,000 Vietnamese were arrested and killed in prison, while an additional tens of thousands fled to Vietnam. Five years later in 1975 when the Khmer republic met its demise at the hands of the Khmer Rouge, fewer than 80,000 Vietnamese remained in Cambodia. The Khmer Rouge proceeded to expel close to three quarters back to Vietnam; the remaining 20,000 were classified as mixed Vietnamese and Khmer descent and were killed by the regime. By the time Vietnamese troops entered Cambodia in 1979, virtually all of Cambodia's Vietnamese population were either displaced or killed. Vietnam established a new regime known as the People's Republic of Kampuchea (PRK), and Vietnamese advisers were appointed in the new government administration. In 1983, the PRK government formulated an official policy to encourage former Vietnamese residents to return and settle in Cambodia. Even Vietnamese immigrants who had no family ties to Cambodia came to settle in the country, as there was little border control to limit Vietnamese migrants from entering the country. The Vietnamese were recognised as an official minority under the PRK regime, and Overseas Vietnamese Associations were established in parts of Cambodia with sizeable Vietnamese populations. The PRK government also identity cards were issued to them until the withdrawal of Vietnamese troops in 1990.

Vietnamese migrant workers started to arrive from 1992 onwards due to the creation of new job opportunities by the UNTAC administration. At the same time, the UNTAC administration allowed the opening of political offices and political parties such as FUNCINPEC and the BLDP began to propagate anti-Vietnamese sentiments among the populace to shore up electorate support in the 1993 general elections. In November 1992, the Khmer Rouge which controlled northwestern parts of Cambodia, passed a resolution to target systematic killings of Vietnamese soldiers and civilians. The first guerrilla-style attacks by the Khmer Rouge on Vietnamese civilians started in December 1992, and Khmer Rouge soldiers justified the killings by claiming that some of the civilians were Vietnamese soldiers in disguise. The spate of killings by Khmer Rouge prompted some 21,000 ethnic Vietnamese to flee to Vietnam in March 1993.

In August 1994, the National Assembly of Cambodia introduced an immigration law which authorised the deportation of illegal immigrants. The UNHCR assessed the law as singling out and targeting Vietnamese migrants in Cambodia; the Cambodian government had to reassure the international community that no mass deportations of Vietnamese refugees would be implemented. Meanwhile in the remote northwest, he Khmer Rouge continued to carry out sporadic attacks on Vietnamese civilians. The Khmer Rouge formally surrendered to the government in 1999 but ethnic Vietnamese continue to face discrimination in Cambodia, both as physical intimidation from the general population and administrative threats by local authorities. Anti-Vietnamese are familiar rallying cries from politicians in campaigns during the general elections and become even more acute when disputes flared in the news between the two countries.

Demographics

Population

The Vietnamese are generally concentrated along the river banks of the Tonlé Sap lake and Mekong river which encompass the provinces of Siem Reap, Kampong Chhnang and Pursat. Smaller populations may be found in Phnom Penh as well as southeastern provinces bordering Vietnam, namely Prey Veng, Svay Rieng, Kampot, Kandal, Kratié and Takéo. The Vietnamese population was at its largest in 1962 when the government census showed that they were the country's largest minority and reflected 3.8% of the country's population. Demographic researchers returned higher estimated numbers of Vietnamese than government censuses reflect. For example, in the 1960s, the number of resident Vietnamese may be as high as 400,000, while another Cambodian-based researcher, Michael Vickery had estimated the Vietnamese resident population to be between 200,000 and 300,000 in 1986. On the other hand, government censuses conducted during the 1980s put the figures to be no more than 60,000. The following population figures shows population figures of ethnic Vietnamese based on figures derived from government censuses:

Religion

The Vietnamese identify themselves as adherents of Mahayana Buddhism, Cao Đài or Roman Catholicism. Vietnamese Buddhists are mainly found among impoverished communities living in the Tonle Sap or the rural parts of Cambodia. As Vietnamese Buddhists derive their religious doctrines and beliefs from Chinese folk religion, they participate in religious rituals organised by Chinese Cambodians during festive seasons. Vietnamese communities that have settled down in Cambodia have adopted Khmer Theravada Buddhist practices to some extent. Vietnamese adherents of Roman Catholicism consist of descendants of refugees that fled the religious persecution during the reign of Tự Đức. They are split between city dwellers based in Phnom Penh and fishing communities that are based in Tonle Sap. Vietnamese Catholics make up about 90% of Cambodia's Roman Catholic community, and in the 1960s they had about 65,000 adherents in the country. Most of the Vietnamese Catholics were either deported to Vietnam or killed in March 1970, and it was only in 1990 that the Catholic church was allowed to re-establish itself in Cambodia. In 2005, there were about 25,000 Catholics in the country.

A minority of Vietnamese are also followers of the Cao Đài faith which was introduced in 1927. The Cao Đài faith attracted both Vietnamese and Cambodian adherents within the first few years of its founding, but a royal decree which outlawed the religion and efforts by Cambodian nationalists to prosecute Khmer adherents led to Cao Dai being observed solely by Vietnamese from the 1930s onwards. A Cao Đài temple was built in Mao Tse Tung Boulevard in 1937, and in the 1960s there were about 70,000 adherents in Cambodia. Cao Đài was outlawed during the Khmer Republic and Khmer Rouge regimes, but regained official recognition in 1985 and has about 2,000 adherents in 2000.

Language

The Vietnamese as a whole exhibit varying levels of fluency in the Khmer and Vietnamese languages. Vietnamese that live in self-contained fishing communities along the Tonle Sap use Vietnamese in their day-to-day conversations and have individuals that have limited Khmer language skills and those that are bilingual in both languages. On the other hand, Vietnamese that live in predominantly Khmer-speaking neighbourhoods send their children to public schools, and as a result the children are able to speak Khmer fluently but show very limited understanding of Vietnamese.

Education

Field research carried out by ethnologists such as Stefan Ehrentraut shows that only a minority of Vietnamese children attend public schools, with figures varying across different provinces. In Kampong Chhnang and Siem Reap where the Vietnamese live along the river banks, enrolment into public schools fare below 10%, whereas in other provinces such as Kampot and Kratie the proportion are higher. As the majority of Vietnamese do not carry citizenship papers, they were unable to enrol their children into public schools. For those who send their children to schools, most of them only attend school for a few years and seldom complete Grade 12 as Vietnamese parents were unable to afford school fees. Vietnamese students also faced difficulties in academic work, as classes are taught exclusively in the Khmer language, and Vietnamese children that grew up speaking Vietnamese at home have limited competency in Khmer. In some Vietnamese communities based in the Tonle Sap and Mekong rivers, there are private schools that are run by Vietnamese community associations and Christian organisations. The private schools cater the teaching of the Vietnamese language, and are mostly attended by children of impoverished families.

Economy

During the French colonial administration, educated Vietnamese were employed in the civil service administration as secretaries, clerks and bureaucrats. When Cambodia gained independence in 1953, the Sihanouk-led government phased out most of the Vietnamese civil servants with Cambodians, and they sought employment in banks and commercial enterprises as secretaries and other office-based positions. In the 1960s, urban-dwelling Vietnamese with lower education backgrounds also worked as mechanics in car repair and machine shops owned by Chinese businessmen. Vietnamese immigrants that settled in the countryside worked as fishermen along the Tonle Sap lake and Mekong river, and also as rubber plantation workers in Kampong Cham and Kratie provinces.

As most Vietnamese are stateless residents, they seek a living through ad-hoc various industries such as the construction, recycling and prostitution industries or as street pedlars. Vietnamese that live along the Tonle Sap lake and Mekong rivers are subsistence fishermen. A sizeable number of these stateless Vietnamese consisted of migrants that came to Cambodia between 1992 and 1993 during the UNTAC administration. The majority of Vietnamese still live below the poverty line, although a very small number of Vietnamese are represented in the Cambodian business sector. One example is Sok Kong, the head of the business conglomerate Sokimex which owns state concessionaires in the country's petroleum, tourism and entrepot industries.

Relations with community and society

Government

Almost 90% of ethnic Vietnamese are stateless residents of Cambodia, and do not carry citizenship papers such as identity cards or birth certificates. The 1996 Cambodian law on nationality technically permits Vietnamese residents born in Cambodia to take up citizenship, but faced resistance from mid-ranking interior ministry officials who generally refrain from registering Vietnamese residents due to concerns of political implications from opposition parties if citizenship were to be granted. A minority of Vietnamese residents were able to obtain citizenship only after paying bribes to interior ministry officials, or were married to Khmer spouses. The minority of Vietnamese residents who hold citizenship reported of interior ministry officials confiscating their citizenship papers. As a result, the Vietnamese faced legal restrictions from getting access to public healthcare, education, employment and buying land for housing as the majority do not carry Cambodian citizenship. Stateless Vietnamese built floating settlements in-lieu of buying land-based dwellings which require citizenship papers. According to field research carried out by Cambodia's Minority Rights Organisation, interior ministry officials would confront Vietnamese fishermen in the Tonle Sap and demand bribes in order to allow them to carry out fishing.

Inter-ethnic relations

Ethnic Khmers have a poor perception of the Vietnamese community, due to persistent feelings of communal animosity from the past history of Vietnamese rule over Cambodia. In 1958, a survey conducted by William Willmott upon high school students in Phnom Penh showed that relations with Chinese were generally rated as friendly, whereas Khmer students viewed their Vietnamese classmates with suspicion. Relations between the Vietnamese and Chinese are considerably better, as both ethnic groups share a close cultural affinity. In recent years, field research carried out by Ehrentraut in 2013 suggested that ethnic relations between Vietnamese have deteriorated not only with the ethnic Khmer, but also with the Cham and Chinese Cambodians.

Most Vietnamese are unrepresented in the Cambodian commune councils as they lack Cambodian citizenship. According to respondents from Ehrentraut's field research, the majority of Cambodian commune chiefs and officials express support in excluding Vietnamese representatives from getting citizenship and participating in commune elections and meetings due to contempt. The Vietnamese appoint their own village heads, and convey community concerns Vietnamese community associations (Vietnamese: Tổng hội người Campuchia gốc Việt) that was first established in 2003. The community associations own limited assets and obtains funding from membership fees, donations from the Vietnamese embassy in Cambodia and sale of cemetery land from the Vietnamese communities. The funds are subsequently used to address Vietnamese communal concerns which includes supporting religious places of worship and teaching of the Vietnamese language, as well as providing assistance to disadvantaged families. While the community associations have the tacit support of the Vietnamese community, the majority do not accept membership for fear of getting social stigma from mainstream Cambodian society. As of 2013, branches of these associations are established in 19 out of 23 provinces across Cambodia.

Politics

The issue of Vietnamese presence in Cambodia has been used as a topic by political parties to shore up electorate support since the 1993 general elections.  Mainstream political parties that participated in the 1993 election included FUNCINPEC, BLDP and MOLINAKA, and they broached on topics concerning the presence of Cambodia's Vietnamese population and perceived Vietnamese interference in the government during campaign trails. These political parties also charged that the presence of Vietnamese in the country were the cause of economic failures, and promises were made to expel the Vietnamese in the situation that they win the elections. During this same period of time, the Khmer Rouge which has earlier refused to participate in the elections also espoused similar anti-Vietnamese sentiments with mainstream political parties albeit on a more extreme form. The Khmer Rouge would issue statements and radio broadcasts accusing UNTAC of collaborating with Vietnam, and called for expulsion of the Vietnamese population through force. They would follow up with attacks upon Vietnamese civilians, which continued even after the end of the 1993 elections.

When the 1998 general elections were held, FUNCINPEC and the then-newly formed Sam Rainsy Party repeated the use of anti-Vietnamese rhetoric in their campaigns. The leaders of these two parties, Norodom Ranariddh and Sam Rainsy charged that some stateless Vietnamese had bribed state officials to obtain citizenship and the Vietnamese government still maintained political influence over the ruling party, the Cambodian People's Party. At the same time, number of incidences of violent attacks against Vietnamese civilians rose, which are carried out by both the Khmer Rouge remnants and Cambodian civilians alike. The number of politically motivated acts of violence against Vietnamese civilians reduced after 2000, and in the subsequent 2003 and 2008 general elections opposition political parties the use of anti-Vietnamese rhetoric was also reduced. In October 2009, Sam Rainsy charged Vietnam of encroaching into Cambodian territory in their border demarcation exercise, and led a group of activists to uproot Cambodian-Vietnamese border posts in Svay Rieng. Although Sam Rainsy was sentenced to imprisonment in absentia over this incident, the incident became a major focus in electoral campaigns by the Cambodia National Rescue Party (CNRP) for the 2013 general elections. CNRP leaders also stoked claims on historical ties of Kampuchea Krom,  and led to more anti-Vietnamese sentiments among CNRP supporters. When the CNRP narrowly lost the 2013 elections, they launched a series of anti-government protests between 2013-2014 which resulted in incidents of Vietnamese shops in Phnom Penh being ransacked. 
 
The vast majority of the Vietnamese support the CPP, and those who carry Cambodian citizenship would vote for the party. Vietnamese support for the CPP has mostly driven by strong anti-Vietnamese sentiments from other political parties. Although many members within the rank and file of the CPP share anti-Vietnamese sentiments with other political parties, the CPP maintained an openly neutral stance towards the Vietnamese community. According to Ehrentraut, the CPP's neutral stance was a balance between not providing open support for the Vietnamese community, which would have the potential effect of losing electoral votes to other political parties, while at the same time maintaining close ties with the Vietnamese government which the CPP had historical ties dating back to 1979. Vietnamese who hold Cambodian citizenship have also expressed fear over physical insecurity during election periods, which is most apparent during the 1993 and 2013 elections when Vietnamese civilians faced physical intimidation from the Khmer Rouge and CNRP supporters respectively and have abstained from participating in elections.

References

Bibliography

Books

Reports and journals

 
 
  
 
 
 

Ethnic groups in Cambodia
 
Cambodian
Cambodia